Michael McQuillan (born 2 October 1959 in Julianstown, County Meath) is an Irish former sportsperson. He played Gaelic football with his local club St Patrick's and was a senior member of the Meath county team in the 1980s and 1990s.

References

1959 births
Living people
Gaelic football goalkeepers
Meath inter-county Gaelic footballers
St Patrick's (Meath) Gaelic footballers
Winners of two All-Ireland medals (Gaelic football)